The Orlanka or Orlanka River, in eastern Poland, is a tributary of the Narew River.

Geography
The Orlanka flows through the geographical region of Europe known as the Wysoczyzny Podlasko – Białoruskie (English: Podlaskie and Belarus Plateau) located in the Podlaskie Voivodeship of Poland.

The drainage area is contained within the mezoregion known as the Równina Bielska (English: Bielsk Plain).

Tributaries

Rivers of Poland
Rivers of Podlaskie Voivodeship